Robert Waldo Brunelle Jr., is an American painter, author, historian, and cartoonist. His visual art was compared in the Vermont newspaper the Brattleboro Reformer to Edward Hopper, with its "images of lonely and alienated individuals, which 'diverge from Hopper in their quirky sense of humor and saturated color." His comic strip, Mr. Brunelle Explains it All, features his takes on politics, current events, and social trends.

Early life, education and teaching career 
Robert was born in Rutland, Vermont on May 14, 1958, to Robert Waldo Brunelle Sr and Joan (Brewster) Brunelle. He is a 12th generation descendant of Elder William Brewster of the Mayflower on his mother's side of the family. The Vermont Art Guide notes, "He counts among his artistic ancestors a great-grandfather, great-grandmother and great-great grandfather, all of whom were painters." Brunelle attended Mount Saint Joseph Academy, receiving his diploma in 1976. He graduated in 1980 from St. Michael's College with dual bachelor's degrees in History and Fine Arts. His Masters in Art Education was conferred by Castleton State College, now Castleton University in 1985. Starting in 1981, he taught art at Browns River Middle School in Underhill, Vermont.

Visual art 

Brunelle has been producing oil and acrylic paintings, shown in regional galleries, since 1975. His early influences included Charles Dana Gibson and Al Capp. Much of his work focuses on local, everyday scenes of buildings, automobiles and persons interacting with them. Rod Underhill's portrait of 'The Yankee Painter' notes, "Echoes of history are usually present in his work".  Brunelle served as President of the Northern Vermont Artist Association from 1995 to 2011, and now serves as its vice president.

Published Works 

His comic strip, Mr. Brunelle Explains It All, appeared monthly in the humor magazine The Funny Times, and weekly on their website Humor Times until 2020, and continues to host the strip on his social media sites. It ran in the Vermont Times newsweekly, and in the Seven Days newsweekly from 2016 to 2020.    The Seven Days newspaper notes that Brunelle's cartoon work "reveals a dry wit and a penchant for skewering political follies, not to mention the general silliness and self-absorption of humans"

Brunelle has illustrated books for authors, including: 
Jack and the Bean Soup by Mark Pendergrast, Nature's Face Publications
Silly Sadie by Mark Pendergrast, Nature's Face Publications. 
Vermont Ghost Guide: A Second Conjuring by Joseph A. Citro, Eerie Lights Publishing
Vermont Ghost Experience by Joseph A. Citro, Eerie Lights Publishing

Brunelle has authored:

 Mr. Brunelle Explains It All. 1997 to present.
 Satire Has Become Impossible. 2011.
Grampy! on Alfred Charles Key, Sr. 2017.
History of the Northern Vermont Artist Association. Kasini House Books. 2009.
The Lesser Known Haunted Houses. 2014.
What I Have Painted So Far
Know Your Nut Jobs! A Handy Field Guide. 2021.

He now resides in Jericho, Vermont with his wife, Grace Clara Key, whom he married in 1983. The two have a step-daughter.

References

External links 
Podcast interview: "Robert Waldo Brunelle Jr., a teacher, painter, cartoonist, and illustrator, explains some of it" on COVE (Community of Vermont Elders) February 15, 2023
Robert Waldo Brunelle Jr. website
'Mr. Brunelle Explains It All' on Humor Times
Northern Vermont Artist Association website
'NEK Artisans Guild Welcomes Artist Robert Waldo Brunelle Jr.' Caledonian Record. February 20, 2020.
Higdon, Bridget. 'What to do this weekend, April 16-18: Artist talks, maple sugaring for kids and live dance performances.' The Essex Reporter. April 16, 2021.
Faignant, Janelle. 'The Art of Technology: Chaffee looks to the art of tomorrow'. Barre Montpelior Times Argus. March 13, 2021.
Corriveau, David. 'Windsor Author Joseph Citro is Still Writing, Telling Weird Tales'. Valley News. October 28, 2016.
Bolles, Dan. 'Joseph A. Citro Gets Real with a New Book on Vermont Ghosts'. Seven Days. October 26, 2016.

21st-century American painters
20th-century American painters
1958 births
Living people
Painters from Vermont
American cartoonists
People from Rutland, Vermont
Castleton State College alumni
Schoolteachers from Vermont
Saint Michael's College alumni
American art educators
American art historians
21st-century American male writers
American children's book illustrators
Editorial cartoonists